Bassia prostrata, the forage kochia, is a Eurasian plant in the subfamily Camphorosmoideae of the family Amaranthaceae (formerly treated as Chenopodiaceae), introduced to the United States as rangeland forage and for fire control.

External links
USDA PLANTS Database Entry
House, Dawn. 2007. Kochia shrub halts Milford Flat blaze - flat. Salt Lake Tribune, August 2.

Amaranthaceae